The Recession of 1949 was a downturn in the United States lasting for 11 months. According to the National Bureau of Economic Research, the recession began in November 1948 and lasted until October 1949.

The 1949 recession was a brief economic downturn; forecasters of the time expected much worse, perhaps influenced by the poor economy in their recent lifetime.  The recession began shortly after President Truman's "Fair Deal" economic reforms. The recession also followed a period of monetary tightening by the Federal Reserve.

The GDP of the U.S.
During this recession, the Gross domestic product of the United States fell 1.7 percent. In October 1949, the unemployment rate reached its peak for the cycle of 7.9 percent.

Main causes of the recession
Many regard the aftermath of the end of World War II to be the main cause of the recession.
According to C. A. Blyth "the most important cause of 1948-1949 recession was substantial fall in the fixed investments".

The severity of this recession
Maximum unemployment was about 7.9%. Change in Gross National Product GNP reduced by up to -1.5%. Department store sales fell 22%. The wholesale price and cost of living indexes fell 12 and 5 points.

References

Further reading

Recessions in the United States
1949 in economics
1948 in economics
1948 in the United States
1949 in the United States
Presidency of Harry S. Truman